Indra Bhattaraka (673 CE) succeeded his brother Jayasimha I as the king of Eastern Chalukyas. He had a very short reign of a week.

His son Vishnuvardhana II succeeded him.

References 
 Durga Prasad, History of the Andhras up to 1565 A. D., P. G. Publishers, Guntur (1988)
 
 Nilakanta Sastri, K. A. (1955). A History of South India, OUP, New Delhi (Reprinted 2002).

Eastern Chalukyas
7th-century monarchs in Asia
Culture of Andhra Pradesh
Telugu monarchs
Hindu dynasties
Telugu people